Jim Courier was the defending champion but did not compete that year.

Yevgeny Kafelnikov won in the final 7–6(7–0), 3–6, 6–1 against Byron Black.

Seeds

  Yevgeny Kafelnikov (champion)
  Daniel Vacek (quarterfinals)
  Renzo Furlan (quarterfinals)
  Jonas Björkman (first round)
  Todd Woodbridge (first round)
  Jakob Hlasek (first round)
  Greg Rusedski (quarterfinals)
  Byron Black (final)

Draw

Finals

Top half

Bottom half

References
 1996 Australian Men's Hardcourt Championships Singles Draw

Next Generation Adelaide International
1996 ATP Tour
1996 in Australian tennis